Marina Stefanoni (born 30 November 2002 in Stamford, Connecticut) is an American professional squash player. As of December 2022, she was ranked number 63 in the world.

References

2002 births
Living people
American female squash players
21st-century American women
Competitors at the 2022 World Games